Istopochnaya is a rural locality (a village) in Nizhne-Vazhskoye Rural Settlement, Verkhovazhsky District, Vologda Oblast, Russia. The population was 17 as of 2002.

Geography 
Istopochnaya is located 16 km east of Verkhovazhye (the district's administrative centre) by road. Bezymyannaya is the nearest rural locality.

References 

Rural localities in Verkhovazhsky District